RX Leporis (RX Lep) is a star in the constellation of Lepus. It is a red giant and is a semi-regular pulsating star.

It has an apparent magnitude that varies from about 5 to 7.4. At its brightest it is dimly visible to the naked eye, and at its dimmest can be located with binoculars. In the sky it is about 4 degrees south of Rigel and is located next to Iota Leporis.

See also
List of variable stars

References

External links
 
 AAVSO: Quick Look View of AAVSO Observations (get recent magnitude estimates for RX Lep)

Lepus (constellation)
Semiregular variable stars
M-type giants
Leporis, RX
033664
1693
024169
Durchmusterung objects